Nicholas Troy Sheley (born July 31, 1979) is an American spree killer. He is serving life in prison for six murders and pled guilty to killing two others in Missouri. He was arrested on July 1, 2008 in Granite City, Illinois. A $25,000 reward was offered for information leading to his arrest. Federal authorities charged him with unlawful flight to avoid prosecution.

Early life
Sheley, of Rock Falls, Illinois, had been arrested frequently since adolescence for crimes ranging from marijuana possession to domestic battery. He and his ex-wife Holly married on May 10, 2008. The couple had been dating since 2004. They later divorced in December 2013 after his arrest.

Murder spree
Sheley's murder spree began on June 23, 2008, when he killed 93-year-old Russell Reed in his hometown, Sterling. Police say Sheley was looking for money to buy cocaine and bludgeoned Reed. Reed's body was found in the trunk of his car three days later.

On June 28, Sheley encountered 65-year-old Ronald Randall at a car wash in Galesburg where Randall had gone to clean his truck; Sheley murdered him and stole his truck, hiding his body behind a grocery store before leaving town. That same night, Sheley drove Randall's truck to Rock Falls and murdered Kenny Ulve, 25, Brock Branson, 29, his fiancée Kilynna Blake, 20, and her son Dayan, 2 in an apartment. All four victims had been bludgeoned with a hammer. Sheley's DNA was found in the apartment and he was seen wearing one of the victim's clothes the next day. Holly Sheley testified that she and her husband had sex the night of the murders by a canal, not in the truck and that the truck's cab was covered in blood. The bodies of Ronald Randall and the four victims in Rock Falls were not discovered until two days later, on June 30.

Sheley fled to Festus, Missouri after the Rock Falls murders and on June 29 allegedly committed his last two murders. The victims were Tom and Jill Estes, both 54, of Sherwood, Arkansas. They had attended a graduation party and were allegedly attacked by Sheley outside the hotel at which they were staying. Sheley put their bodies in Randall's truck and hid the bodies behind a gas station.

Arrest and legal proceedings
The night before his arrest, Sheley was seen outside of a St. Louis Cardinals game, where he asked to use a tailgater's cell phone. Sheley also requested that the man delete the phone numbers. However, police were able to trace the call back to a drug house in the Kirkwood area. On July 1, Sheley was arrested outside of a bar in Granite City, IL, after bar patrons recognized him from news reports and contacted the local police. He surrendered peacefully.

Sheley was convicted of the first-degree murder of Randall in Knox County, Illinois on September 29, 2011. His trial for the murder of Reed began in Whiteside County, Illinois on October 22, 2012. He was found guilty on November 6 of charges of first-degree murder, home invasion, and residential burglary, and was sentenced on January 16, 2013, to life imprisonment for the murder, as well as 30 years for home invasion and 15 years for residential burglary. He is an inmate at Pontiac Correctional Center, in Pontiac, Illinois.

Sheley was also found guilty of first-degree murder in a Rock Island County court on May 29, 2014, for the four murders in Rock Falls. He was sentenced on August 11, 2014. His wife, Holly, testified against him in exchange for immunity. Prosecutors have said that Sheley killed the four victims in Rock Falls after finding out that Branson was having an affair with Holly Sheley.

In February 2015, Sheley was extradited to Jefferson County, Missouri to stand trial for the murders of the Estes' where prosecutors are seeking the death penalty. Illinois, unlike Missouri, does not have a death penalty.

In January 2016 he appeared in court represented by public defenders asking that the trial be moved to another town to secure an unbiased jury. The judge advised that he would rule later in the week. The judge denied both the change of venue request and a motion for a new judge.

In January 2017 a trial date was set in Missouri. The jury selection was scheduled for 4–5 January 2018 followed by a two-week trial starting on 8 January. Later in October 2017, Sheley pleaded guilty to the two murders in Missouri to avoid a possible death sentence. He is now serving his sentence at Stateville Correctional Center in Illinois.

Victims

Confirmed

See also

 List of rampage killers in the United States

References

External links
Sheley's FBI Wanted Poster 
Sheley's profile on America's Most Wanted
Details surrounding Sterling man's death come to light in trial

1979 births
American robbers
Living people
People from Rock Falls, Illinois
American prisoners sentenced to life imprisonment
American spree killers
American murderers of children
2008 murders in the United States
Mass murder in the United States
People convicted of murder by Illinois
People convicted of murder by Missouri
Prisoners sentenced to life imprisonment by Illinois
Prisoners sentenced to life imprisonment by Missouri
People from Sterling, Illinois
Stabbing attacks in the United States